Sphingini is a tribe of moths of the family Sphingidae. The tribe was described by Pierre André Latreille in 1802.

Taxonomy 
Genus Amphimoea
Genus Amphonyx
Genus Apocalypsis
Genus Ceratomia
Genus Cocytius
Genus Dolba
Genus Dolbogene
Genus Dovania
Genus Ellenbeckia
Genus Euryglottis
Genus Hoplistopus
Genus Ihlegramma
Genus Isoparce
Genus Lapara
Genus Leucomonia
Genus Lintneria
Genus Litosphingia
Genus Lomocyma
Genus Macropoliana
Genus Manduca
Genus Meganoton
Genus Morcocytius
Genus Nannoparce
Genus Neococytius
Genus Neogene
Genus Oligographa
Genus Panogena
Genus Pantophaea
Genus Paratrea
Genus Poliana
Genus Praedora
Genus Pseudococytius
Genus Pseudodolbina
Genus Psilogramma
Genus Sagenosoma
Genus †Sphingidites
Genus Sphinx
Genus Thamnoecha
Genus Xanthopan

Gallery

References

 
Sphinginae